Kootenai Lakes are in Glacier National Park, in the U. S. state of Montana. The Kootenai Lakes are in the Waterton Valley in the north central section of Glacier National Park. It is commonly recognized for its trail, Kootenai Lakes Trail. It is a 5.5 mile lightly trafficked out and back trail near Babb, Montana that features one of the Kootenai lakes and is good for all skill levels. The trail is primarily used for hiking, walking, nature trips, and fishing and is best used from April until October.

See also
List of lakes in Glacier County, Montana

References

Lakes of Glacier National Park (U.S.)
Lakes of Glacier County, Montana